Same-sex marriage in Georgia has been legal since the U.S. Supreme Court's ruling in Obergefell v. Hodges on June 26, 2015. Attorney General Sam Olens said that Georgia would "adhere to the ruling of the Court", and the first couple married just minutes after the ruling was handed down. Previously, Georgia had banned same-sex marriage both by statute and its State Constitution.

Restrictions and domestic partnerships
On November 2, 2004, voters passed Amendment 1, a constitutional amendment banning same-sex marriage. State statutes also banned same-sex marriage and prohibited the recognition of same-sex marriages performed in other jurisdictions.

A few municipal entities, including Athens, Atlanta, Avondale Estates, Clarkston, Decatur, Doraville, East Point, Savannah, Pine Lake, and DeKalb and Fulton counties, have established a domestic partnership registry for city or county employees. This provides the couples limited legal benefits, including health care benefits.

Lawsuits

Burns v. Burns
In 2000, Susan Burns and Debra Jean Freer filed Burns v. Freer seeking recognition of their Vermont civil union. Fulton County Superior Court Judge Larry Salmon ruled against the couple on January 30, 2001, finding that a civil union could not be recognized in Georgia as equivalent to a marriage. On January 23, 2002, the Georgia Court of Appeals declared civil unions invalid in Georgia.

Perdue v. O'Kelley
On May 17, 2006, Fulton County Superior Court Judge Constance C. Russell ruled that Amendment 1 violated procedural rules of the Constitution of Georgia that ballot questions should be limited to a single subject. Russell said, "People who believe marriages between men and women should have a unique and privileged place in our society may also believe that same-sex relationships should have some place although not marriage. The single-subject rule protects the right of those people to hold both views and reflect both judgments by their vote." Governor Sonny Perdue said, "The people of Georgia knew exactly what they were doing when an overwhelming 76 percent voted in support of this constitutional amendment. It is sad that a single judge has chosen to reverse this decision.", and announced plans to appeal to the Georgia Supreme Court. On July 7, 2006, the Georgia Supreme Court reversed the lower court ruling and declared the 2004 constitutional amendment valid in Perdue v. O'Kelley.

Inniss v. Aderhold
On April 22, 2014, three same-sex couples and a widow, represented by Lambda Legal, filed a lawsuit in the U.S. District Court for the Northern District of Georgia on behalf of themselves and all unmarried same-sex couples and all state residents who had married same-sex spouses in other jurisdictions. Another couple was later added to the suit, which was assigned to Judge William S. Duffey Jr. Two of the four couples had married in Connecticut and New Hampshire. The suit, Inniss v. Aderhold, named Deborah Aderhold, the State Registrar and Director of Vital Records, as the principal defendant. The Attorney General of Georgia, Sam Olens, filed a motion to dismiss in September 2014, and the defendants later argued for an extension to file their briefs because of the volatility of same-sex marriage cases around the country. Judge Duffey granted an extension to October 22, 2014. On January 8, 2015, Judge Duffey denied the defendants' motion to dismiss. He found that the plaintiffs were asserting they had a fundamental right to marry a partner of the same sex, which was not a right protected by the Due Process Clause of the U.S. Constitution. Since a fundamental right was not at issue, he explained he would assess Georgia's ban under the least restrictive standard of review, rational basis. He denied the motion to dismiss because the state defendants had not yet met the rational basis standard by explaining the link between Georgia's ban on same-sex marriage and the state's interest in "child welfare and procreation".

On January 20, 2015, the defendants asked Judge Duffey to suspend proceedings until the U.S. Supreme Court ruled in pending same-sex marriage cases, and the plaintiffs supported that request on January 27. On January 29, the court suspended some proceedings, but allowed the parties to appeal his earlier order to the Eleventh Circuit, so that court would have a wider set of arguments to consider along with the Florida case, Brenner v. Scott. On June 26, 2015, the Supreme Court ruled in Obergfell v. Hodges that the Due Process and Equal Protection clauses of the Fourteenth Amendment guarantee same-sex couples the right to marry. The decision legalized same-sex marriage nationwide in the United States. Governor Nathan Deal said, "While I believe that this issue should be decided by the states and by legislatures, not the federal judiciary, I also believe in the rule of law...The state of Georgia is subject to the laws of the United States, and we will follow them." Attorney General Olens also said he opposed the court ruling but that "Georgia will follow the law and adhere to the ruling of the Court". He instructed state agencies and state employees to treat same-sex couples equally to different-sex couples, and instructed county clerks to issue marriage licenses to same-sex couples. All counties began immediately (or announced they were willing to) issue marriage licenses to same-sex couples.

Emma Foulkes and Petrina Bloodworth were the first same-sex couple to marry in Georgia just one hour after the Supreme Court's ruling. Fulton County Judge Jane Morrison officiated at their marriage at the Fulton County Courthouse in Atlanta. The Mayor of Atlanta, Kasim Reed, said, "Today is a historic occasion for the City of Atlanta, for Georgia and for America. The Supreme Court's ruling marks a momentous victory for freedom, equality, and love. It is clear that the arc of history continues to bend ever closer toward justice." Jeff Graham, the executive director of Georgia Equality, issued the following statement: "The United States Supreme Court has ruled in favor of the freedom to marry across the nation. It's a national victory – and it means that soon, thousands of loving, committed couples throughout the United States – including our state of Georgia – will be able to say 'I do' and at last be respected under the law." Christie and Kindra Baer, a couple for 13 years, were the first to receive a marriage license in Savannah, and Moriah Martin and Jordyn Dolente were the first to marry in Athens just after 2 p.m. at the Clarke County Courthouse. Taylor Nash and Kelly Martinelli were the first same-sex couple to marry in Gwinnett County. Representative John Lewis welcomed the court ruling, saying, "Races don't fall in love, genders don't fall in love--people fall in love.", and Representative Hank Johnson called it "historic". Bernice King, CEO of The King Center and daughter of Martin Luther King Jr., said, "It is my sincere prayer that this ruling helps to alleviate violence, in all forms, including physical force, toward our LGBT brothers and sisters; and that the Supreme Court ruling encourages the global community to respect and embrace all LGBT global citizens with dignity and love. In the words of our founder and my mother, Coretta Scott King, 'The Civil Rights Movement that I believe in thrives on unity and inclusion, not division and exclusion.'" State Senator Vincent Fort said the decision was "a victory not just for the LGBT community but for all Americans who believe in justice", and Rob Wright, the Episcopal Bishop of Atlanta, said, "In the days ahead, whatever your position, I ask you to keep close to your heart and lips the words of scripture, that "God is love." Christ's church is trans-political, above all earthly partisanship. Therefore, if love has won even a small victory today, then let us rejoice."

Developments after legalization
Following the overturning of Roe v. Wade in June 2022 by the U.S. Supreme Court, several state lawmakers expressed concern that Obergefell could be at risk. Representative Sam Park said, "The same-sex marriage ban is still on the books, and my understanding is that it would go into effect if the Supreme Court overturns the Obergefell opinion." Governor Brian Kemp said he continued to personally oppose same-sex marriage but that "Dobbs''' majority opinion states that Obergefell is settled". Stacey Abrams, Kemp's opponent in the 2022 gubernatorial election, pledged to "codify marriage equality into our state's laws".

Demographics and marriage statistics
Data from the 2000 U.S. census showed that 19,288 same-sex couples were living in Georgia. By 2005, this had increased to 24,424 couples, likely attributed to same-sex couples' growing willingness to disclose their partnerships on government surveys. Same-sex couples lived in all counties of the state and constituted 1.1% of coupled households and 0.6% of all households in the state. Most couples lived in Fulton, DeKalb and Cobb counties. Same-sex partners in Georgia were on average younger than opposite-sex partners, and more likely to be employed. In addition, the average and median household incomes of same-sex couples were higher than different-sex couples, but same-sex couples were far less likely to own a home than opposite-sex partners. 20% of same-sex couples in Georgia were raising children under the age of 18, with an estimated 8,852 children living in households headed by same-sex couples in 2005.

According to data from the United States Census Bureau, there were 17,514 same-sex married households in Georgia in 2020.

Public opinion
According to the Public Religion Research Institute (PRRI), 45% of Georgia residents supported same-sex marriage in 2015. In 2016, support had increased to 51% according to the same pollster.PRRI: American Values Atlas 2016 Others polls, notably one conducted by The Atlanta Journal-Constitution'' in 2013 showed that Millennials overwhelmingly supported same-sex marriage, while those above 65 were mostly opposed.

In 2017, the PRRI found that 52% of Georgia residents supported same-sex marriage, while 39% were opposed and 9% were undecided. A PRRI survey conducted between January 7 and December 20, 2020 on 1,770 random telephone interviewees showed that 61% of respondents supported same-sex marriage, while 32% were opposed. A survey conducted by the same pollster between March 8 and November 9, 2021 showed that 60% of respondents supported same-sex marriage, while 37% opposed and 3% were undecided.

See also
LGBT rights in Georgia (U.S. state)
Same-sex marriage in the United States

References

LGBT in Georgia (U.S. state)
Georgia
2015 in LGBT history
2015 in Georgia (U.S. state)